Robert Curtis Smith (February 17, 1930 – November 10, 2010) was a Piedmont blues singer, guitarist and songwriter from Cruger, Mississippi, US.

Smith was influenced by Big Bill Broonzy. He recorded one album, for Bluesville Records, released in 1963.

Biography
Smith was born in or near Cruger, Holmes County, Mississippi, United States, and was African-American. He worked as a farm labourer, where he and his wife raised eight children. He first played the blues guitar in 1948. He left Mississippi twice in hope of finding alternative employment in either Chicago or Texas, but each time he returned to his home state.

In 1960, by chance, he met Paul Oliver and Chris Strachwitz in Wade Walton's Big Six barber shop in Clarksdale, Mississippi. This led him to record some tracks that year and in 1961, and the album Clarksdale Blues: The Blues of Robert Curtis Smith was released in 1963. One of his songs, "Council Spur Blues", made direct references to the conditions on the plantation where he worked.

In 1968, he left Mississippi again for Chicago, where he spent the remainder of his life. Around this time he auditioned for a place in Willie Dixon's backing band. He later joined the church and played gospel music instead of the blues. Walton eventually tracked him down, and in 1997 Smith appeared at the Sunflower River Blues Festival in Clarksdale, playing only gospel songs.

Death
Smith died in Chicago in November 2010, aged 80.

Discography

Album

Single

See also
List of Piedmont blues musicians

References

External links
Discography at Wirz.de

1930 births
2010 deaths
American blues guitarists
American male guitarists
American blues singers
American male singers
Songwriters from Mississippi
Piedmont blues musicians
Blues musicians from Mississippi
People from Holmes County, Mississippi
Guitarists from Mississippi
20th-century American guitarists
20th-century American male musicians
American male songwriters